Fire clay is a range of refractory clays used in the manufacture of ceramics, especially fire brick. The United States Environmental Protection Agency defines fire clay very generally as a "mineral aggregate composed of hydrous silicates of aluminium (Al2O3·2SiO2·2H2O) with or without free silica."

Properties
Fire clays range from flint clays to plastic fire clays, but there are semi-flint and semi-plastic fire clays as well. Fire clays consist of natural argillaceous materials, mostly Kaolinite group clays, along with fine-grained micas and quartz, and may also contain organic matter and sulphur compounds.

Its stability during firing in the kiln means that it can be used to make complex items of pottery such as pipes and sanitary ware.

Chemical composition
The chemical composition typical for fire clays are 23-34% Al2O3, 50-60% SiO2 and 6-27% loss on ignition together with various amounts of Fe2O3, CaO, MgO, K2O, Na2O and TiO2. Chemical analyses from two 19th-century sources, shown in table below, are somewhat lower in alumina
although a more contemporary source quotes analyses that are closer.

Extraction
Unlike conventional brick-making clay, some fire clays (especially flint clays) are mined at depth, found as a seatearth, the underclay associated with coal measures.

References

Ceramic materials
Silicates
Refractory materials
Bricks
Clay